The women's parallel giant slalom competition of the Vancouver 2010 Olympics was held at Cypress Mountain on February 26, 2010.

Results

Qualification

Elimination round

Classification 5-8
The four quarterfinal losers entered the consolation bracket, where they raced for positions five through eight.

References

External links
 2010 Winter Olympics results: Ladies' Parallel Giant Slalom (qual), from http://www.vancouver2010.com/; retrieved 2010-02-25.
 2010 Winter Olympics results: Ladies' Parallel Giant Slalom (1/8 finals), from http://www.vancouver2010.com/; retrieved 2010-02-25.
 2010 Winter Olympics results: Ladies' Parallel Giant Slalom (1/4 finals), from http://www.vancouver2010.com/; retrieved 2010-02-25.
 2010 Winter Olympics results: Ladies' Parallel Giant Slalom (semifinals), from http://www.vancouver2010.com/; retrieved 2010-02-25.
 2010 Winter Olympics results: Ladies' Parallel Giant Slalom (finals), from http://www.vancouver2010.com/; retrieved 2010-02-25.

Snowboarding at the 2010 Winter Olympics
Women's events at the 2010 Winter Olympics